Barnes & Noble Booksellers is an American bookseller. It is a Fortune 1000 company and the bookseller with the largest number of retail outlets in the United States. As of July 7, 2020, the company operates 614 retail stores across all 50 U.S. states.

Barnes & Noble operates mainly through its Barnes & Noble Booksellers chain of bookstores. The company's headquarters are at 33 E. 17th Street on Union Square in New York City.

After a series of mergers and bankruptcies in the American bookstore industry since the 1990s, Barnes & Noble stands alone as the United States' largest national bookstore chain. Previously, Barnes & Noble operated the chain of small B. Dalton Bookseller stores in malls until they announced the liquidation of the chain. The company was also one of the nation's largest manager of college textbook stores located on or near many college campuses when that division was spun off as a separate public company called Barnes & Noble Education in 2015. 

The company is known by its customers for large retail outlets, many of which contain a café serving Starbucks coffee and other consumables. Most stores sell books, magazines, newspapers, DVDs, graphic novels, gifts, games, toys, music, and Nook e-readers and tablets. The company offers publishing and self-publishing services.

History

19th century: Foundations

Barnes & Noble began in 1886 as a bookstore called Arthur Hinds & Company, located at 4 Cooper Institute in the Cooper Union Building in New York City. In the fall of 1886, Gilbert Clifford Noble, a then-recent Harvard graduate from Westfield, Massachusetts, was hired to work there as a clerk.

In 1894, Noble was made a partner, and the name of the shop was changed to Hinds & Noble.

20th century: Expansion

1900–1919
In 1901, Hinds & Noble moved to 31–35 W. 15th Street.

In 1917, Noble bought out Hinds and entered into a partnership with William Barnes, son of his old friend Charles Barnes; the name of the store was changed to Barnes & Noble soon after. Charles had previously opened a book-printing business in Wheaton, Illinois, in 1873, named the C. M. Barnes-Wilcox Company; William Barnes, however, divested himself of his ownership interest in his father's business shortly before his partnership with Noble. (His father's company would go on to become the Follett Corporation.) Although the flagship store once featured the motto "Founded in 1873," the C. M. Barnes-Wilcox Company never had any connection with Barnes & Noble, save for the fact that both were partly owned (at different times) by William Barnes.

1920–1939
In 1930, Noble sold his share of the company to William Barnes' son, John Wilcox Barnes. Noble died on June 6, 1936, at the age of 72. In 1932, at the height of the Great Depression, the bookstore moved its flagship location to 18th Street and Fifth Avenue, which served as the company's flagship location until its closure in 2014. The Noble family retained ownership of an associated publishing business, and Barnes & Noble opened a new publishing division in 1931.

1940–1959
In 1940, the store was one of the first businesses to feature Muzak, and it underwent a major renovation the following year. That decade, the company opened stores in Brooklyn and Chicago. William Barnes died in 1945, at the age of 78, and his son John Wilcox Barnes assumed full control. The company underwent a significant expansion between the 1950s and the 1960s, opening an additional retail store on 23rd Street in Manhattan, as well as shops near the City University of New York, Harvard, and other Northeast college campuses.

1960–1979

John Barnes died in 1964, and the company was sold to the conglomerate Amtel two years later. The business was then purchased in 1971 by Leonard Riggio, who has been credited as one of the founders, for $1.2 million. By then, it had been mismanaged and consisted only of "a significantly reduced wholesale operation and a single retail location—the flagship store at 105 Fifth Avenue." The publishing operation was sold separately by Amtel to Harper & Row. In 1974, Barnes & Noble became the first bookstore chain to advertise on television and a year later, the company became the first bookseller in the United States to discount books, by selling The New York Times best-selling titles at 40% off the publishers' list price. Between the 1970s and the 1980s, Barnes & Noble opened smaller discount stores, which were eventually phased out in favor of larger stores. They also began to publish their own books to be sold to mail-order customers. These titles were primarily affordable reissues of out-of-print titles and selling them through mail-order catalogs allowed Barnes & Noble to reach new customers nationwide.

In November 1974, editors of the British-produced Guinness Book of Records, claimed on the BBC One television program Record Breakers that the Fifth Avenue store of Barnes & Noble had overtaken that of London's Foyles bookshop to become the world's biggest bookstore.

1980–1999

Barnes & Noble continued to expand throughout the 1980s, and it purchased the primarily shopping mall-based B. Dalton chain from Dayton Hudson in 1986, for an estimated $275 million to $300 million. Solveig Robinson, author of The Book in Society: An Introduction to Print Culture, wrote that the purchase "gave [Barnes & Noble] the necessary know-how and infrastructure to create what, in 1992, became the definitive bookselling superstore." The acquisition of the 797 B. Dalton bookstores turned the company into a nationwide retailer, and by the end of fiscal year 1999, the second-largest online bookseller in the United States. B&N's critics claim that it has contributed to the decline of local and independent booksellers. The last B. Dalton stores ceased operations in January 2010.

In 1989, Barnes & Noble purchased the 22-store chain Bookstop.

In September 1993, Barnes & Noble became a publicly traded company by issuing $77 million worth of stock on the New York Stock Exchange under the BKS ticker symbol. The company remained on the stock exchange until August 2019 when Elliot Management purchased all of the company's stock and took the company private.

Before Barnes & Noble created its official website, it sold books directly to customers through mail-order catalogs. It first began selling books online through an early videotex service called "Trintex", a joint venture between Sears and IBM, but the company's website was not launched until May 1997. BarnesandNoble.com went public in 1999.

21st century: Operating in an electronic environment

2000s

In 2004, it was reported that the reading of books was on the decline in America, with the number of non-reading adults increasing by 17 million between 1992 and 2002. Despite this, Barnes & Noble claimed that its retail store business was expanding in the book market. Beginning in 1999, Barnes & Noble owned GameStop, a video game and electronics retail outlet. The company distributed its shares in GameStop in late 2004, spinning it off into its own company in an attempt to simplify its corporate structure.

CEO Leonard Riggio stepped down in 2002, naming his younger brother and former acting chief executive of BarnesandNoble.com, Stephen Riggio, to succeed him. Some corporate governance experts noted that this appointment could potentially cause conflict of interest, but the company board noted that Riggio's experience at the company made him the right person for the job. Stephen Riggio stepped down from the position in 2010.

2010s

In 2010, website president William Lynch was named CEO. He is credited with helping launch the company's electronic book store and overseeing the introduction of its electronic book reader, the Nook. Many observers saw his appointment as underscoring the importance of digital books to Barnes & Noble's future. Steve Riggio stayed on as vice chairman.  When Lynch resigned in mid-2013, he was replaced by Chief Financial Officer Michael Huseby early the next year. Following the spinoff of Barnes & Noble Education, Huseby departed to head the new firm; his place was filled in mid-2015 by Ronald Boire, who departed one year later. Demos Parneros was named Barnes & Noble's Chief Executive Officer in April 2017 after having joined the company as Chief Operating Officer in November 2016; however, he was fired in July 2018 for "company policy violations" without severance and was immediately removed from the company's board, at the advice of a law firm hired by Barnes & Noble. On August 28, 2018, Parneros filed a lawsuit against Barnes & Noble, claiming wrongful termination.

After the bankruptcy and closure of its chief competitor, Borders Group, in 2011, Barnes & Noble became the last remaining national bookstore chain in the United States. This followed a series of mergers and bankruptcies in the American bookstore industry since the 1990s, which also saw the demise of Waldenbooks, Barnes & Noble's own subsidiary B. Dalton, and Crown Books, among others. Barnes & Noble's largest physical bookstore rival is now Books-A-Million, which does not operate in the Western US. Barnes & Noble also faces competition from general retailers, especially from Amazon.com, and from regional and independent booksellers. Amazon has even opened its own physical bookstores, once again creating a second national bookstore chain.

Barnes & Noble began reducing its overall presence in the 2010s, closing its original flagship store in early 2014. In mid-2014, the company announced it would separate its Nook Media division from its retail store division.

In February 2018, Barnes & Noble permanently laid off 1,800 full time employees at an annual cost savings of $40 million per year. According to TechCrunch, the company essentially fired their entire full time staff at all their stores, who would be making an average of $22,000 per year (~$11 per hour), and were replaced by part time workers earning close to minimum wage.

In the 2018 fiscal year that ended in July, the company's overall losses reached $17 million.

In early July 2018, Barnes & Noble fired CEO Demos Parneros for an unspecified violation of company policy, which was later revealed to be over sexual harassment claims. It accused Pareneros of breaching his duties of loyalty and good faith and acting as a "faithless servant" by sexually harassing the female employee, bullying subordinates, and attempting to "sabotage" a potential acquisition of the New York-based company, and asserted that the company should therefore be entitled to claw back his salary, bonus, and other benefits during the period of his "disloyal conduct".

On October 3, 2018, the board of directors announced that they would entertain offers to buy the company. Among the potential buyers was Leonard Riggio, who owned at the time approximately 19% of Barnes & Noble stock. As a result of the news, the company's stock price jumped by nearly 30%.

In August 2019, Elliott Management Corporation acquired the company for approximately $683m with James Daunt, the managing director of London-based Waterstones Booksellers Ltd., becoming CEO. James Daunt was to become CEO of both Waterstones and Barnes & Noble and was to relocate from London to New York. On August 7, 2019, Barnes & Noble became a privately held, wholly owned subsidiary of Elliott.

2020s
In March 2020, Barnes & Noble announced that it would temporarily stop selling magazines and, likewise temporarily, close 400 of its 620 stores due to the COVID-19 pandemic. Around 12 B&N shops were closed for good since Elliott Advisors' acquisition of the company, and Daunt plans to change the acquisition process, with initial frontlist orders being made centrally and in smaller numbers than in previous years. In April 2022, The New York Times reported the company used the temporary closure of stores during the pandemic to refurbish them, and credited Daunt with turning around sales both in store and online. During the COVID-19 pandemic, Barnes & Noble saw up to a 500% increase in graphic novel and manga sales.

Publishing
Barnes & Noble maintains a separate publishing business in addition to its retail stores and other entities. Barnes & Noble's publishing company got its start by reissuing inexpensive versions of out-of-print books, and made a push to expand the unit in 2003. The company saw success the following year; in September 2004, its book, Hippie, reached The New York Times Best Seller list.

Barnes & Noble often publishes and sells books at a lower cost than competitors, and sells lines of inexpensive books like Barnes & Noble Classics and the leather-bound Barnes & Noble Collectible Classics collection which has it has published since 1992. In addition, the company has a second paperback series called the Barnes & Noble Library of Essential Reading. Barnes & Noble's edition of The Gentle Art of Verbal Self-Defense by Suzette Haden Elgin, has sold over 250,000 copies, and its reissued edition of The Columbia History of the World by John Garrity, has sold over 1 million copies.

The company has expanded business by acquiring several firms over the years, including J.B. Fairfax International in 1999, SparkNotes, an educational website and publishing company, in 2001 and Sterling Publishing in 2003.

Food service

In 1993, Barnes & Noble signed an agreement to serve Starbucks coffee in each of its existing and future cafes. In 2004, Barnes & Noble began offering Wi-Fi in the café area of selected stores, using SBC FreedomLink (now the AT&T Wi-Fi network). All stores offered Wi-Fi as of 2006 and as of July 27, 2009, Wi-Fi is offered for free to all customers.

In 2016, Barnes & Noble announced plans to open four concept stores in 2017 that featured cafés twice the size of its usual food spots, as well as bars offering wine and beer. Restaurants would also include a waitstaff and a full menu for breakfast, lunch, and dinner. The restaurants were expected to revive sales growth. Company executives planned to open additional concept stores if sales met expectations. The first stores were opened in Scarsdale, New York; Edina, Minnesota; Plano, Texas; and Folsom, California.

Community involvement
Barnes & Noble hires community business development managers to engage in community outreach. The Barnes & Noble located in Fairbanks, Alaska gave over $80,000 to the community between 2015 and 2018 through book fair fundraising programs. To promote nationwide literacy among 1st through 6th graders and encourage more reading and learning during the summer, Barnes & Noble has implemented a summer challenge.

The Barnes & Noble Review 
The Barnes & Noble Review is an online magazine, hosted on Barnes & Noble's website, that publishes evaluations of both fiction and nonfiction works, along with essays, interviews, and pieces on other topics. It was launched in October 2007 by Barnes & Noble CEO Steve Riggio and James Mustich Jr., publisher of the book catalog A Common Reader. Regular contributors to the magazine have included book critics Michael Dirda, Brooke Allen, Laura Miller, and Adam Kirsch, as well as prominent writers in fields outside of literary criticism, such as political journalists Chris Hayes and Ezra Klein, philosopher A. C. Grayling, music critic Robert Christgau, and cartoonist Ward Sutton. Miller, who has written for Salon and Mustich's Common Reader, said, "The reviews [at BNR] are the same as anywhere else", adding that the tone and length of the pieces evoke The New York Times Book Review rather than the less formal Salon. The magazine's web traffic flourished during its first few years. According to Compete.com, it amassed 50,000 unique visitors in December 2009.

Some critics were originally skeptical of The Barnes & Noble Review. Art Winslow, former literary editor of The Nation, said that because Barnes & Noble is a brand name, BNRs contributors are effectively endorsing the corporation, and that the motives behind the publication undermine its integrity: "Criticism's content should be free of any commercialism. Barnes & Noble has found another way to sell books, and that's the Review. ... I wouldn't write there." Mustich disputed the idea that the magazine serves as a corporate tactic: "We counter that skepticism with quality. If people read the site, they can determine that we are doing what we purport to do. They have never tried to influence my judgment. The first attempt would have been the last."

Barnes & Noble Nook

Barnes & Noble Nook (styled NOOK) is a suite of e-book readers developed by the company, based on the Android platform. The first device was announced in the United States on October 20, 2009, and was released November 30, 2009, for $259. On June 21, 2010, Barnes & Noble reduced the Nook's price to $199, as well as launched a new Wi-Fi-only model, for $149, and released a Nook colored touch screen for $249.

The Nook competes with the Amazon Kindle, Kobo eReader, and other e-reader offerings and color tablets with reading apps, such as Apple's iBooks for iOS devices. Various Nook models feature a 6-inch, 7-inch, or larger touchscreen. Version 1.3 of the Nook introduced Wi-Fi connectivity, a web browser, a dictionary, chess, and sudoku games, and a separate, smaller color touchscreen that serves as the primary input device. The Nook also features a Read in Store capability that allows visitors to stream and read any book for up to one hour while shopping in a Barnes & Noble bookstore. According to a June 2010 CNet article, the company planned to expand this feature to include periodicals in the near future. The color version of the Nook introduced a 7-inch color touchscreen and the ability to view at a portrait or landscape orientation.

On April 30, 2012, Microsoft invested $300 million for a 17.6% stake in Nook, which valued the business at about $1.7 billion.

In November 2012, the technology publications Mashable and Techdirt criticized the license agreement with which Barnes & Noble sells ebooks to consumers, pointing out that the rights to re-download a purchased ebook expire when the customer's credit card expires, and a valid credit card must be added to the account to restore this functionality.

In June 2014, Barnes & Noble had previously announced that it would spin off its Nook Digital division into a separate publicly traded company, but as of 2016, Nook remains a part of Barnes & Noble. That same month, the company announced a partnership with Samsung Electronics to make Nook tablets, as the bookseller moved forward with plans to revamp its digital business. Samsung and Barnes & Noble introduced the Samsung Galaxy Tab 4 Nook 7.0 in August 2014, followed by the Samsung Galaxy Tab 4 Nook 10.1 in October 2014. In December 2014, Barnes & Noble announced that it had ended its Nook partnership with Microsoft by buying back its stake. Samsung and Barnes & Noble continue to introduce new Nook tablets.

In March 2016, Barnes & Noble announced it would close the Nook App Store and Nook Video and in the UK close the Nook Store on March 15. It continues to sell e-books as well as digital magazines and newspapers in the US.

In 2021, the company announced the release of a new 10-inch Android-based tablet, which is named the Nook 10" HD, in a partnership with Lenovo, which is manufacturing the device.

College bookstores spin-off

Barnes & Noble formerly had a subsidiary, Barnes & Noble College Booksellers, that specialized in operating campus bookstores at colleges and university. In 2015, the college operations were spun off into a new separate company, Barnes & Noble Education.

See also

 Book Stacks Unlimited
 Bookselling
 List of book distributors
 List of bookstore chains
 List of group-0 ISBN publisher codes

References

Further reading
 
 
 Archived at Ghostarchive and the Wayback Machine: 
 Barnes & Noble is splitting up its businesses (again)

External links

 
 Barnes & Noble SEC Filing
 Barnes & Noble at 18th Street Bookstore (flagship store)

 
1917 establishments in New York City
2019 mergers and acquisitions
American companies established in 1917
Book selling websites
Bookstores established in the 20th century
Bookstores in Manhattan
Bookstores of the United States
Companies based in Manhattan
Companies formerly listed on the New York Stock Exchange
Ebook suppliers
Music retailers of the United States
Online retailers of the United States
Private equity portfolio companies
Privately held companies based in New York City
Retail companies established in 1917